Karan Ramsay (alias Kiran Ramsay) was a producer, sound designer and director of Bollywood films. He was one of the Ramsey Brothers, a group of siblings who worked as directors, producers and editors in the Bollywood industry. His brothers were Shyam Ramsay, Kumar Ramsay, Keshu Ramsay Tulsi Ramsay Gangu Ramsay and Arjun Ramsay.

Producer

Director

Sound Department

AS cameraman

External links

Hindi-language film directors
Living people
Hindi film producers
Year of birth missing (living people)